5th AFCA Awards

Best Film:
The Hurt Locker

The 5th Austin Film Critics Association Awards, honoring the best in filmmaking for 2009, were announced on December 15, 2009.

Top 10 Films
 The Hurt Locker
 Star Trek
 Up
 A Serious Man
 Up in the Air
 Avatar
 Inglourious Basterds
 District 9
 Where the Wild Things Are
 Moon and The Messenger (TIE)

Top 10 Films of the Decade
 Eternal Sunshine of the Spotless Mind
 There Will Be Blood
 The Lord of the Rings
 The Dark Knight
 Requiem for a Dream
 Kill Bill
 No Country for Old Men
 The Incredibles
 Children of Men
 Memento and The Departed (TIE)

Winners
 Best Film:
 The Hurt Locker
 Best Director:
 Kathryn Bigelow – The Hurt Locker
 Best Actor:
 Colin Firth – A Single Man
 Best Actress:
 Mélanie Laurent – Inglourious Basterds
 Best Supporting Actor:
 Christoph Waltz – Inglourious Basterds
 Best Supporting Actress:
 Anna Kendrick – Up in the Air
 Best Original Screenplay:
 Inglourious Basterds – Quentin Tarantino
 Best Adapted Screenplay:
 Up in the Air – Jason Reitman and Sheldon Turner
 Best Cinematography:
 The Hurt Locker – Barry Ackroyd
 Best Original Score:
 Up – Michael Giacchino
 Best Foreign Language Film:
 Sin Nombre • Mexico / United States
 Best Documentary:
 Anvil! The Story of Anvil
 Best Animated Feature:
 Up
 Best First Film:
 Neill Blomkamp – District 9
 Breakthrough Artist Award:
 Christian McKay – Me and Orson Welles
 Austin Film Award:
 Me and Orson Welles – Richard Linklater

References

External links
 IMDb page
 Official website

2009 film awards
2009